Lankin may refer to

Surname
Dmitriy Lankin (born in 1997), Russian artistic gymnast
Eliyahu Lankin (1914–1994), Israeli politician
Frances Lankin (born in 1954), Canadian politician